"Heart on the Mend" is a song written by Kye Fleming and Dennis Morgan, and recorded by American country music artist Sylvia.  It was released in September 1981 as the fifth single from the album Drifter.  The song reached #8 on the Billboard Hot Country Singles & Tracks chart.

Content
The song focuses on a woman who runs into an old lover in a honky tonk and hides her feelings for him, despite her heart still being broken and on the mend.

Chart performance

References

1981 singles
1981 songs
Sylvia (singer) songs
Songs written by Kye Fleming
Songs written by Dennis Morgan (songwriter)
Song recordings produced by Tom Collins (record producer)
RCA Records singles